Ascot Hotel Copenhagen is a 4-star hotel located at Studiestræde 61 in central Copenhagen, Denmark. It is located in the former Københavns Badeanstalt (Copenhagen Public Bath House), a public bath house from 1901-03, as well as in some of the adjacent buildings.

History
Copenhagen Public Bath House was built at the initiative of a physician named Hjær. It was built in 1901-03 and designed by Gotfred Tvede and Valdemar Schmidt. The groundfloor contained a vestibule flanked by a restaurant and hairdresser's for men and women. The bathing facilities were located in the side wing while the premises on the upper floors of the main wing were let out to clinics. The bathing facilities were divided by gender. The section for women were located in the ground floor while the section for men was located on the first and second floors.

Hotel Ascot opened in the building in the early 1970s.

Today
The hotel is owned by the Hildebrandt Hammer family and has 150 rooms. An additional 60 hotel apartments in the neighbouring building Vægtergården closed down in 2018 and will be converted into 113 hotel rooms. They will be marketed under a new brand but the two hotels will share facilities such as lobby and restaurant.

References

External links

 Official website

Hotels in Copenhagen
Former public baths in Denmark
National Romantic architecture in Copenhagen
Commercial buildings completed in 1903